The men's 100 kilograms (Half heavyweight) competition at the 2006 Asian Games in Doha was held on 2 December at the Qatar SC Indoor Hall.

Schedule
All times are Arabia Standard Time (UTC+03:00)

Results
Legend
WO — Won by walkover

Main bracket

Repechage

References
Results

External links
Official website

M100
Judo at the Asian Games Men's Half Heavyweight